|}

The Prix Perth is a Group 3 flat horse race in France open to thoroughbreds aged three years or older. It is run at Saint-Cloud over a distance of 1,600 metres (about 1 mile), and it is scheduled to take place each year in late October or early November.

History
The event is named after Perth, a successful racehorse whose career concluded in 1900. It was established in 1901, and was originally run at Maisons-Laffitte over 2,200 metres. It was extended to 2,400 metres in 1906, and to 2,500 metres in 1908.

The Prix Perth was abandoned throughout World War I, with no running from 1914 to 1918. It was held at Saint-Cloud over 2,400 metres in 1919, and at Maisons-Laffitte over 2,500 metres in 1920. A period at Saint-Cloud over 2,500 metres began in 1921.

The race was cancelled twice during World War II, in 1939 and 1940. It was switched to Longchamp and increased to 3,000 metres in 1941. It was staged at Maisons-Laffitte in 1943, Le Tremblay in 1944, and Longchamp again in 1945. It reverted to 2,500 metres at Saint-Cloud in 1946.

The current version of the Prix Perth was introduced in 1949. From this point its distance was 1,600 metres. It was contested at Longchamp in 1954, and returned to Saint-Cloud in 1955.

The present system of race grading started in 1971, and the Prix Perth was classed at Group 3 level. It was shortened to 1,550 metres in 1978, and restored to 1,600 metres the following year.

Records
Most successful horse (2 wins):
 Exema – 1902, 1903
 Le Debardeur – 1925, 1926
 Jim and Tonic – 1997, 2000

Leading jockey (5 wins):
 Paul Blanc – Prince Ki (1946), Symphonie (1947), Ksarinor (1950), Bougainville (1951), Riverain (1953)
 Dominique Boeuf – French Stress (1988), Handsome Ridge (1998), Special Kaldoun (2002), Passager (2006), Zafisio (2009)

Leading trainer (4 wins):
 Criquette Head-Maarek – Gay Minstrel (1986), Malaspina (1987), Danzigaway (1999), Passager (2006)

Leading owner (3 wins):
 Jean Stern – Bougainville (1951), Sweet Home (1957), Lelio (1960)
 Mahmoud Fustok – Hilal (1980), Green Paradise (1984), Over the Ocean (1985)

Winners since 1981

 Neverneyev finished first in 1995, but he was relegated to second place following a stewards' inquiry.
 The 2017 running was abandoned due to protests at Saint-Cloud.

Earlier winners

 1901: Grey Melton
 1902: Exema
 1903: Exema
 1904: Hebron
 1905: Presto
 1906: Montlieu
 1907: Moulins la Marche
 1908: Mafia II
 1909: Herouval
 1910: Ronde de Nuit
 1911: Lahire
 1912: Agenda
 1913: Fidelio
 1914–18: no race
 1919: Samourai
 1920: Manor
 1921: Astypalee
 1922: Subaltern
 1923: Kefalin
 1924: Mazeppa
 1925: Le Debardeur
 1926: Le Debardeur
 1927: Petit Bob
 1928: Sachet
 1929: Amorina
 1930: Florac
 1931: Tapinois
 1932: Foxarella
 1933: Annonciade
 1934: Grand Lama
 1935: Bilbao
 1936: Sanglot
 1937: Organeau
 1938: Argentino
 1939–40: no race
 1941: Babouino
 1942: Duralumet
 1943: Guirlande
 1944: L'Aretin
 1945: Boum
 1946: Prince Ki
 1947: Symphonie
 1948:
 1949: Floral Art
 1950: Ksarinor
 1951: Bougainville
 1952: La Fangeaye
 1953: Riverain
 1954: Le Lanfonnet
 1955: Eban
 1956: Blockhaus
 1957: Sweet Home
 1958: La Vanda
 1959: Red Arrow
 1960: Lelio
 1961: Rieuse
 1962: Aravios
 1963: Piaf
 1964: Baldric
 1965: Tycoon
 1966: Adjar
 1967:
 1968:
 1969: Jimmy Reppin
 1970: Lord Gayle
 1971: Sparkler
 1972: Gift Card
 1973: Silver Zara
 1974: El Rastro
 1975: Riot in Paris
 1976: Dominion
 1977: Jellaby
 1978: A Thousand Stars
 1979: Tannenberg
 1980: Hilal
</div>

See also
 List of French flat horse races

References

 France Galop / Racing Post:
 , 
 france-galop.com – A Brief History: Prix Perth.
 galopp-sieger.de – Prix Perth.
 horseracingintfed.com – International Federation of Horseracing Authorities – Prix Perth (2016).
 pedigreequery.com – Prix Perth – Saint-Cloud.

Open mile category horse races
Saint-Cloud Racecourse
Horse races in France
Recurring sporting events established in 1901